Thierry Jamin (French: [tieʁi ʒamɛ̃]; born 19 December 1967) is a French explorer and pseudohistorian known for his research about Paititi and the presence of the Incas and pre-Inca civilization in the Amazonian rainforest.

In search of Paititi and Inca presence
In 2001, Jamin reaches the site of Pantiacolla. The pyramids are in fact natural formations but Jamin said to have find some Inca artefacts in the same area. At the site of Pusharo he realized that some of the petroglyphs are only visible at a certain moment of the day.

In July 2006, Jamin returned to the area of the Pyramids of Pantiacolla. 
He then returned to Pusharo and studied the petroglyphs. His assumptions are that the ancient rock site could be an ancient roadmap leading to a major archeological site. In the area of Pusharo, he also discovered geoglyphs that are similar to the Nazca lines. According to Jamin this evidence demonstrates an Inca presence in this area.

In 2009, with the help of the French television TF1, the city of Toulouse and private partners, Jamin studied the site of Mameria. A few weeks later, Jamin started a new exploration campaign in the Valley of Lacco. He contributed to valorize some sites like the fortress of Hualla Mocco (area Hualla), and the small cities of Torre Mocco and of Lukma Kancha (area Quinuay). He also contributed to valorize the small cities of Patan Marka and Llaqtapata (area Juy Huay), the ceremonial site of P'ukru (area Mesapata). In the area of Qurimayu, he studied another city, also called Llaqtapata, and composed of about 150 buildings, a dozen streets, and two main squares.

In 2010, Jamin returned to the valleys of Lacco and Chunchusmayu and discovered several archaeological sites. There he explored new areas and studied the ruins of Inka Tampu and the third Llaqtapata. After further investigations at Monte Punku, he returned to Lacco where he studied the citadels of Pantipayana (area Rataratayuq), Apucatina (area Pallamiyuq), Inka Raqay (area Qurimayu), Chawpichullu (area Chawpichullu), Hatun Monte (area Juy Huay) and Puma Qucha (Juy Huay).

The "secret door" of Machu Picchu
In August 2011, Jamin was contacted by David Crespy, a French engineer from Barcelona, Spain. A year before, while he was visiting Machu Picchu, he noticed what looked like a 'hidden door' located at the bottom of one of the main buildings. After visiting the site, Jamin, confirmed the existence of a door and on December 19, 2011, he submitted a research project with the objective to use ground-penetrating radar technologies to determine if some cavities were located behind the door, which was approved by the Peruvian Ministry of Culture. Jamin's team investigated the site in March 2012.

With the help of several technologies, the team led by Jamin, and composed by the Peruvian archaeologist Hilbert Sumire Bustincio, the Spanish archeologist Daniel Ángel Merino Panizo and the Peruvian architect and specialist in conservation Víctor Armando Pimentel Gurmendi, were able to detect the presence of cavities and the possibility of archaeological material. Based on the results of the non-invasive techniques used by Jamin's team, one of their assumptions is that the site could be the burial tomb of Pachacutec.

On May 22, 2012, Jamin submitted a new project proposal to the Ministry of Culture to open the door. In November 2012, the regional Direction of Culture of Cusco denied the authorization to excavate the site and, in February 2013, strongly criticized, along with the Direction of Machu Picchu Archaeological Park, the lack of scientism and methodology of his project and assumptions. As per February 2013, the Ministry of Culture from Lima has not made any decision and negotiations are ongoing, and Jamin hopes for a new study conducted by a third party.

Some days after these polemics, Jamin declared to have received anonymous death threats by mail, and that he wanted to sue the Regional Direction of Culture of Cusco for having declared he's a tomb robber.

Publications

Books and publications written by Jamin include:

See also
 Paititi
 Paratoari
 Pusharo
 Mameria

References

1967 births
Living people